is a Japanese professional football club based in Kobe, Hyōgo Prefecture. The club plays in the J1 League, which is the top tier of football in the country. The team's home stadium is Noevir Stadium Kobe, in Hyōgo-ku, though some home matches are played at Kobe Universiade Memorial Stadium in Suma-ku.

History

Beginnings in Chugoku
The club was founded in 1966 as the semi-professional Kawasaki Steel Soccer Club in Kurashiki, Okayama Prefecture. It was first promoted to the Japan Soccer League Division 2 in 1986, and stayed there until the JSL folded in 1992.

Move to Kansai and professionalism
In 1995, the city of Kobe reached an agreement with Kawasaki Steel, the parent company, to move the club to Kobe and compete for a spot in the professional J.League as Vissel Kobe. Vissel is a combination of the words "victory" and "vessel", in recognition of Kobe's history as a port city. (Owing to its importance to the city of Kobe, Kawasaki Heavy Industries, parent company of former team patron Kawasaki Steel, remains a Vissel Kobe sponsor. Kawasaki Steel was eventually sold off to become part of JFE Holdings.)

Vissel Kobe began play in 1995 in the Japan Football League, a league below J.League, and the supermarket chain Daiei was slated as the club's primary investor. However, the economic downturn following the Great Hanshin earthquake forced Daiei to pull out and the city of Kobe became responsible for operating the club.

Despite finishing 2nd in the JFL in 1996, Vissel was promoted to the J.League (the champions, Honda FC, refused to abandon their corporate ownership and become a professional club) and began play in the top division of Japanese football in 1997. However, due to mismanagement, including the inability to secure investors and sponsors, Vissel has never been a contender for the league title. In December, 2003, mounting financial losses forced the club to file for bankruptcy protection.

Crimson Group years (2004–2014)

In January 2004, Vissel was sold to Crimson Group, parent company of online merchant Rakuten, whose president is Kobe native Hiroshi Mikitani. Vissel's first signing under the Mikitani regime, İlhan Mansız, who was acquired partly to capitalize on his popularity during the 2002 FIFA World Cup hosted in Korea and Japan, was a massive failure – the Turkish forward played just three matches before leaving the team because of a knee injury. Mikitani also alienated supporters by changing the team uniform colours from black and white stripes to crimson, after his Crimson Group and the colour of his alma mater, Harvard Business School. The Tohoku Rakuten Golden Eagles, a baseball team also owned by Rakuten but based in Sendai, wear the same colours.

Vissel finished 11th in the league in 2004, the same position as the previous year, and finished 18th and last place in 2005, resulting in automatic relegation from J.League Division 1, or J1, to J2. During the two-year span, Vissel had five different head coaches. 2006 was Vissel's first season in J2 after nine years in the top division of soccer in Japan. They finished 3rd in the 2006 season and were promoted to J1 after beating Avispa Fukuoka in the promotion/relegation play-offs.

During the period of 2007 to 2011 Vissel finished in the bottom half of the table each year. In 2012 they finished 16th, third from last, and were again relegated to J2. In 2013, Vissel finished in second place, 4 points behind Gamba Osaka, which secured their return to J1 for the 2014 season.

On 6 December 2014, Rakuten Inc. bought the team from the Crimson Group.

Rakuten years and first successes (2014–present)
In May 2018, Vissel signed 2010 FIFA World Cup winner Andrés Iniesta from FC Barcelona. In December 2018 Vissel Kobe managed to sign David Villa from New York City FC the Spanish striker scored 13 goals in 28 games. Alongside Sergi Samper and Andrés Iniesta, Villa was the third Spaniard in the team in that season in which the Emperor's Cup was won.

On 1 January 2020, first time finalist Vissel beat Kashima Antlers in the 2019 Emperor's Cup final at the recently opened New National Stadium to win the first title in the club history. The furthest Kobe had been in the Cup was the semi-finals of 2000 and 2017. This was Spanish striker David Villa's last professional match. Vissel also qualified for the 2020 AFC Champions League for the first time. On 8 February 2020, Vissel beat Yokohama F. Marinos to win their first Japanese Super Cup title and respectively their second national title ever. In 2021 they achieved an historic third place in the table, qualifying for the AFC Champions League yet again.

Record as J.League member

Key

Honours
Emperor's Cup
 Winners: 2019
Japanese Super Cup
 Winners: 2020
Chūgoku Soccer League (as Kawasaki Steel Mizushima)
 Winners (5): 1980, 1981, 1982, 1984, 1985

League history
Chugoku Soccer League: 1978–85 (as Kawasaki Steel Mizushima)
Division 2 (Japan Soccer League Div. 2): 1986–91 (Kawasaki Steel Mizushima until 1987; Kawasaki Steel afterwards)
Division 3 (Old JFL Div. 2): 1992–93 (as Kawasaki Steel)
Division 2 (Old JFL): 1994–96 (Kawasaki Steel 1994; Vissel Kobe since 1995)
Division 1 (J.League): 1997–2005
Division 2 (J.League Division 2): 2006
Division 1 (J.League Division 1): 2007–12
Division 2 (J.League Division 2): 2013
Division 1 (J1 League): 2014–present

Total (as of 2014): 16 seasons in the top tier, 11 seasons in the second tier, 2 seasons in the third tier and 8 seasons in the Regional Leagues.

Continental record

Current squad 
.

Out on loan

Reserve squad (U-18s) 
; Squad for the 2022 season.

Club staff 
For the 2023 season.

Manager history

Kit evolution

Affiliated clubs
  Savan United F.C.

References

External links

 Official Vissel Kobe Website

 
J.League clubs
Japan Soccer League clubs
Football clubs in Japan
Association football clubs established in 1966
1966 establishments in Japan
Rakuten
Japan Football League (1992–1998) clubs
Sports teams in Kobe
Emperor's Cup winners